Adoxophyes templana is a species of moth of the family Tortricidae. It is found in Australia (the Northern Territory and Queensland), but also on the Bismarck Archipelago.

The wingspan is about 15 mm. The forewings are pale brown with irregular variable broad dark brown lines.

The larvae feed on Citrus, Rhizophora stylosa, Aegiceras corniculatum, Excoecaria agallocha, Melaleuca dealbata and Melaleuca quinquenervia. They are a pest in Citrus orchards. They attack the rind of the developing fruit of their host plant.

References

Moths described in 1900
Adoxophyes
Moths of Oceania